The Bertram F. Bongard Stakes is a listed stakes race for Thoroughbred two-year-olds run in the fall at Belmont Park, New York.

At a distance of 7 furlongs, it will be in its 39th running in 2016.  The Bongard is a major prep race for up-and-coming young horses and offers a purse of $150,000.  Though not restricted to New York bred horses, this is not an open race: it is considered an event on the New York bred schedule.

This race was run at a mile and an eighth prior to 1983 and also from 1984 to 1988.  It went at seven furlongs in 1983, and from 1996 to the present.  It was set at a mile and a sixteenth from 1989 to 1993 and at six furlongs in 1994 and 1995.  Run for three-year-olds and up prior to 1984, now it is run for two-year-olds only.

Named for Bertram F. Bongard who was a founding director of Eastern New York Thoroughbred Breeders' Association, it was for three-year-olds and up prior to 1984, but is now strictly for two-year-olds.   Before 1984, it was called the Bertram F. Bongard Handicap.

Winner of the Kentucky Derby and the Preakness Stakes, Funny Cide, won this race in 2003.

Past winners

 2016 – Mirai (José Ortiz)
 2015 – Sudden Surprise (John R. Velazquez)
 2014 – Saratoga Heater (Joel Rosario)
 2013 – Wired Bryan (John Velazquez)
 2012 – Weekend Hideaway
 2011 – RACE NOT RUN?
 2010 – RACE NOT RUN
 2009 – Make Note
 2008 – Trinity Magic (Shaun Bridgmohan)
 2007 – Big Truck (Ramon Domínguez)
 2006 – I'm A Numbers Guy (Stewart Elliott)
 2005 – Sharp Humor (Edgar Prado)
 2004 – Up Like Thunder (Javier Castellano)
 2003 – Flagshipenterprise (Mark Guidry)
 2002 – Funny Cide (José A. Santos)
 2001 – White Ibis (Robbie Davis)
 2000 – Le Grande Danseur (Jorge Chavez)
 1999 – Image Maker (Jorge Chavez)
 1998 – David (Aaron Gryder)
 1997 – Ruby Hill (José A. Santos)
 1996 – Patent Pending (Robbie Davis)
 1995 – Out To Win (Julie Krone)
 1994 – Cyrano (Mike E. Smith)
 1993 – Bit of Puddin (Mike E. Smith)
 1992 – Over the Brink (Aaron Gryder)
 1991 – Phantom Finn (Eddie Maple)
 1990 – Well Well Well (Diane Nelson)
 1989 – Applebred (Jean-Luc Samyn)
 1988 – Gold Oak (Eddie Maple)
 1987 – Notebook (José A. Santos)
 1986 – Sweet Envoy (Jacinto Vásquez)
 1985 – Wild Wood (Michael Venezia)
 1984 – Hot Debate (Don MacBeth)
 1983 – Master Digby (Ángel Cordero Jr.)
 1982 – Fearless Leader (Don MacBeth)
 1981 – Accipiter's Hope (Cash Asmussen)
 1980 – Fio Rito (Leslie Hulet)
 1979 – International (Jorge Velásquez)
 1978 – Judging Man (Ángel Cordero Jr.)

External links
Belmont Park official website

Restricted stakes races in the United States
Flat horse races for two-year-olds
Horse races in New York (state)
Belmont Park
1978 establishments in New York (state)
Recurring sporting events established in 1978